Vira Mykhaliïvna Zozulya (born 31 August 1970 in Hvardiyske, Ternopil Oblast) is a Ukrainian race walker, who competed in three consecutive Summer Olympics for her native country, starting in 2000.

Achievements

References

sports-reference

1970 births
Living people
Ukrainian female racewalkers
Athletes (track and field) at the 2000 Summer Olympics
Athletes (track and field) at the 2004 Summer Olympics
Athletes (track and field) at the 2008 Summer Olympics
Olympic athletes of Ukraine
Sportspeople from Ternopil Oblast